Aisha Buhari Invitational tournament is an association football tournament organized by the Nigerian football federation for the female national team.

History
The Inaugural edition was held in Lagos with both FIFA and CAF president honoring the event  The South Africa women's national team came first in the Aisha Buhari cup's inaugural edition. The event was held at the Mobolaji Johnson Stadium, Lagos, Nigeria.

Format
The competition comprises six nations which includes, Ghana, South Africa and the hosts Nigeria

Results

See also

International competitions in women's association football
FIFA Women's World Cup
Women's Olympic Football Tournament
Cyprus Women's Cup
SheBelieves Cup
Turkish Women's Cup

References

International women's association football invitational tournaments
Women's football friendly trophies
Recurring sporting events established in 2021
Football competitions in Nigeria
Women's football in Nigeria